Signature Towers (formerly known as Dancing Towers) was a proposal for a three-tower, mixed-use complex in Dubai, United Arab Emirates. It was designed by Iraqi born architect Zaha Hadid after winning an international design competition which included proposals from OMA and Reiser & Umemoto among others. The developers were Dubai Properties, the company responsible for the earlier Jumeirah Beach Residence. Apart from these three towers, the project would also include a new building to house the Dubai Financial Market, a large podium containing retail space and a pedestrian bridge crossing the creek extension.

History
The project was first unveiled to the public in June 2006 at a Zaha Hadid exhibition in the Guggenheim Museum in New York City. At the time of the launch the name for the project was Dancing Towers; however, this has now been changed to Signature Tower & Dubai Financial Market Development.

Gallery

See also
Supertall
Skyscraper
Zaha Hadid
List of tallest buildings in Dubai
List of tallest buildings designed by women

References

Proposed skyscrapers in Dubai
Futurist architecture
Architecture in Dubai
High-tech architecture
Postmodern architecture
Zaha Hadid buildings